Duchêne may refer to:

People
Achille Duchêne (1866–1947), French garden designer
Deborah Duchêne (born 1962), American film, television, and stage actress
Denis Auguste Duchêne (1862–1950), French World War I general
Gabrielle Duchêne (1870–1954), French feminist and pacifist
Gilbert-Antoine Duchêne (1919–2009), French bishop of the Roman Catholic Church
Kate Duchêne (born 1959), British actress
Maria Duchêne (born 1884), French contralto of the Metropolitan Opera
Marysa Baradji-Duchêne (born 1982), French épée fencer
Matt Duchene (born 1991), Canadian ice hockey player
Roger Duchêne (1930–2006), French biographer
Stefanie Duchêne, former member of German gothic metal band "Flowing Tears"

Other uses
Canard-Duchêne, French champagne house

See also
María Duchén (born 1965), Bolivian journalist and politician
Duchesne (disambiguation)